Phylloboletellus is a genus of bolete fungi in the family Boletaceae.

References

Boletaceae
Monotypic Boletales genera
Taxa named by Rolf Singer